Nezapir ( also spelled Neza Pir, Neza Peer and Nezapeer) or Nezapir sector is a village area located in the Haveli District of Azad Kashmir. It has an estimated population of about 112,000.

Conflict 
Nezapir sector is located near the Line of Control, and for several years, has been an area of strife between the two neighboring countries, Pakistan and India.

References 

Populated places in Haveli District